Thomas Anthony Scully (born 1 October 1999) is an English professional footballer who plays for Nantwich Town as a midfielder.

Career
Born in Liverpool, Scully began his career with Everton, leaving that club and signing for Norwich City in the summer of 2018. In May 2019 he spoke about his struggles with depression.

After leaving Norwich, in September 2020 he signed for Accrington Stanley. He moved on loan to Carrick Rangers in January 2022.

On 13 September 2022, Scully joined Nantwich Town on a 1 month loan.

On 12 November 2022, Scully left Accrington Stanley and signed for Nantwich Town on a permanent deal.

References

1999 births
Living people
Footballers from Liverpool
English footballers
Association football midfielders
Everton F.C. players
Norwich City F.C. players
Accrington Stanley F.C. players
Nantwich Town F.C. players
Carrick Rangers F.C. players
English Football League players
NIFL Premiership players